Marion Edwards Park (1875-1960) was an American academic administrator who was the third president of Bryn Mawr College, her alma mater, following alumna M. Carey Thomas.

Biography
Park was born in Gloversville, New York in 1875. Her brother, Dr. E. A. Park was head of the department of pediatrics at Yale University.

During her tenure as a student at Bryn Mawr College, she received the Bryn Mawr European Fellowship and used it to attend the American School of Classical Studies in Athens, Greece. Park presided over the college during the Great Depression and the beginning of World War II, where she worked with other colleges to employ refugee scholars from European universities. Park was also instrumental in initiating cross-institution collaboration between Bryn Mawr College, Haverford College, Swarthmore College, and the University of Pennsylvania.

She died in 1960.

Publications
"The plebs in Cicero's day, a study of their provenance and of their employment"

References

Further reading
 Meigs, Cornelia (1956). What Makes A College? A History Of Bryn Mawr. New York: The Macmillan Company.

External links
   Finding Aid to the Marion Edwards Park Papers, Bryn Mawr College Library

Bryn Mawr College alumni
Presidents of Bryn Mawr College
1875 births
1960 deaths